Trans Studio Bandung is a shopping mall, amusement park, and hotel in Bandung, Indonesia. Trans Studio Bandung is composed of several sections including a shopping mall called Trans Studio Mall (usually referred as TSM), a recreation park called Trans Studio, a 3-star hotel called ibis Bandung Trans Studio, and a 5-star luxury hotel called The Trans Luxury Hotel.

Trans Studio Mall Bandung 
Trans Studio Mall Bandung (TSM) is the largest shopping mall in Bandung, Indonesia. The mall is located at Jalan Gatot Subroto, and has 5 floors in total. The mall's tenants include a Metro Department Store, Gramedia, a movie theater TSM XXI, Trans Studio Bandung, Hero Supermarket, and many more. The mall is part of the CT Corp, owned by Chairul Tanjung. With the addition of a theme park Trans Studio Bandung, ibis Bandung Trans Studio, and The Trans Luxury Hotel, the Trans Studio complex has become a one-stop entertainment site for tourists. Trans Studio Mall Bandung also has a lot of photo spots which makes the shopping mall becomes more fun for teenagers and young adults. The main atrium of the shopping mall is decorated by hundreds of paper butterflies which make this spot is the most beautiful spot throughout the shopping mall. Other than for tourism, the shopping mall also family friendly with the existence of a movie theater TSM XXI and a theme park Trans Studio Bandung.

History 

Earlier Trans Studio Mall Bandung was called with a name of Bandung Supermall. The mall opened at October 25, 2001. On June 30, 2012, the name of the mall was changed from Bandung Supermall into Trans Studio Mall Bandung.

Tenants 
The Trans Studio Mall Bandung has both local as well as international tenants. Some of the most notable local tenants are: Batik Keris, Bebek Garang, Metro, Gramedia and many others. Some of the most notable international tenants are: Guess, Hugo Boss, Lacoste, Mango, Nike, Starbucks Coffee and many more. Most of the luxury brand stores are located on the first level, while the fourth level has mostly cafes and restaurants. There is also a movie theater, called TSM XXI, that is located on the fifth floor.

Notable events 
The amphitheatre of Trans Studio Bandung has reportedly caught fire on Tuesday, October 14, 2014. Fortunately, the fire was able to be contained 15 minutes after the occurrence. As for the potential cause, the General Manager for Marketing Communication of the Trans Studio Bandung Integrated Area, Grandy Prajayakti, shared that the fire had engulfed a flammable material in the theme park.

On March 19, 2016, the mall had a blackout starting from PM8:30. This blackout is part of the Earth Day ceremony. On April 14, 2015, the mall hosted a fashion show called FASHIONATIC2015. The fashion show is focused toward local Indonesian culture fashion, e.g., batik, rather than a regular fashion show. On October 31, 2015, the mall also hosted a Halloween Party where there were of people dressed like a ghost.

Trans Studio Bandung 

Trans Studio Bandung Theme Park is one of the biggest indoor theme parks in the world. It was opened on June 18, 2011 in the area of Bandung Supermall as the second theme park in Indonesia after Trans Studio Makassar, which was opened in 2008. In comparison to the Trans Studio Makassar, the attractions in Trans Studio Bandung are more adventurous and challenging since they mainly target young adults whereas the ones in Makassar are more suitable for family. Trans Studio Bandung theme park is divided into 3 different themes with a total of 20 rides.

Studio Central 
The Studio Central section has an old Hollywood theme. Visitors can see a number of Hollywood artists such as Marilyn Monroe, Michael Jackson & Jeng Kelin on the Walk of Fame in Hollywood 60's architectural design style.
 Racing Coaster (a launched roller coaster manufactured by Premier Rides)
 Super Heroes 4D (a 4D simulator featuring Marvel characters)
 Broadcast Museum
 Dunlop Trans Car Racing
 Indosat Galaxy Vertigo (a Power Surge manufactured by Zamperla)
 Trans City Theatre
 Giant Swing (a pendulum ride)
 Si Bolang Adventure (A dark ride themed to an Indonesian kids TV program)
 Science Center
 Dunia Anak (an underground kids area with mostly carnival games)
 Pemburu Badai (a 40m S&S Double Shoot added in August 2018, relocated from Loudoun Castle)
 CNN Indonesia

Lost City 
The Lost City section has many adventurous rides, such as rescuing the Trans TV crews in their expedition to the jungle along the safari track.
 Jelajah
 Kong Climb
 Sky Pirates
 Amphitheater

Magic Corner 
The Magic Corner is a fantasy themed area containing 6 attractions.
 Negeri Raksasa
 Black Heart's Pirate Ship
 Dragon Raiders
 Pulau Liliput
 Dunia Lain
 Special Effect Action Show

References 

Amusement parks opened in 2001
2001 establishments in Indonesia
Bandung
Amusement parks in Indonesia
Shopping malls in Indonesia
Post-independence architecture of Indonesia
CT Corp